Guajiquiro is a municipality in the Honduran department of La Paz.

Demographics
At the time of the 2013 Honduras census, Guajiquiro municipality had a population of 14,616. Of these, 83.68% were Indigenous (83.60% Lenca), 15.99% Mestizo, 0.16% White, 0.16% Black or Afro-Honduran and 0.01% others.

References

Municipalities of the La Paz Department (Honduras)